Neil Fitzgerald (15 January 1893 – 15 June 1982) was an Irish actor.

Cornelius James Fitzgerald was born at Henry Street (now O'Brien Street), Tipperary, the son of James Joseph Fitzgerald, a grocer, and Ellen McGrath. He was educated in Trinity College Dublin, studying pharmacy, but chose to become an actor.

He made his Broadway debut in Leave Her to Heaven in 1940. He appeared in numerous Irish plays on Broadway during his life. His credited film debut was in 1935 in John Ford's The Informer as "Tommy Connor". He had numerous television credits also.

He died in 1982 in Princeton, New Jersey.

Filmography

References

External links

1893 births
1982 deaths
Irish male film actors
Irish male stage actors
People from Tipperary (town)
People from Princeton, New Jersey
20th-century Irish male actors